Olinto Cristina (5 February 1888 – 17 June 1962) was an Italian actor and voice actor.

Biography
Born in Florence to actors Raffaello Cristina and Cesira Sabatini, Cristina began acting on stage as a child. His sisters Ines Cristina Zacconi, Jone Frigerio and Ada Cristina Almirante were also actresses. His sister Ines was the mother of actress Margherita Bagni and the grandmother of actress Nora Ricci, she married secondly Ermete Zacconi. On screen, he appeared in more than 75 films between 1932 and 1957. He also was a renowned dubber in Italian post-synchronized versions of foreign films, providing his voice for actors such as C. Aubrey Smith, Sig Ruman, Frank Morgan or Lionel Barrymore. As far as animated films are concerned, he dubbed Doc in Snow White and the Seven Dwarfs, Friend Owl in Bambi and others.

Selected filmography

 Pergolesi (1932)
 Creatures of the Night (1934)
 The Joker King (1935)
 A Woman Between Two Worlds (1936)
 White Amazons (1936)
 Adam's Tree (1936) 
 The Black Corsair (1937)
 Doctor Antonio (1937)
 To Live (1937)
 Dora Nelson (1939)
 Wealth Without a Future (1939)
 The Sons of the Marquis Lucera (1939)
 Diamonds (1939)
 The First Woman Who Passes (1940)
 One Hundred Thousand Dollars (1940)
 Big Shoes (1940)
 Lucky Night (1941)
 Caravaggio (1941)
  Love Story (1942)
 Farewell Love! (1943)
 The Children Are Watching Us (1944)
 I'll Sing No More (1945)
 The Innocent Casimiro (1945)
 Crossroads of Passion (1948)
 The Ungrateful Heart (1951)
 The Eternal Chain (1952)
 The Overcoat (1952)
 Torna! (1953)
 It's Never Too Late (1953)
 Schiava del peccato (1954)

References

External links

1888 births
1962 deaths
Italian male film actors
Italian male voice actors
Actors from Florence
20th-century Italian male actors